The Djoudj National Bird Sanctuary lies on the southeast bank of the Senegal River in Senegal, in northern Biffeche, north east of St-Louis.

It provides a range of wetland habitats which prove very popular with migrating birds, many of which have just crossed the Sahara. Of almost 400 species of birds, the most visible are pelicans and flamingos. Less conspicuous are the aquatic warblers migrating here from Europe; for these, the park is the single most important wintering site yet discovered . A wide range of wildlife also inhabits the park, which is designated a World Heritage Site. The site was added to the list of World Heritage in Danger in 2000 due to the introduction of the invasive giant salvinia plant, which threatens to choke out the park's native vegetation. However it was removed from the list in 2006.

Environmental issues
Since operation of the Diama Dam on the Senegal River began in 1988, experts have observed a lowering of the water level, desalinization, and silting. The changes pose a threat to the fauna and flora. There has been in particular a proliferation of typhas and Phragmites. To the left, satellite photos take by NASA in 1979 (before construction of the dam) and 1999 (afterwards) give evidence of the significant impact on the region's ecosystem.

In 2006, though no cases of avian flu had been reported in Senegal, a monitoring program was put into effect.

See also
 Diawling National Park
 Wildlife of Senegal

References

 WCMC Natural Site Data Sheet
 Official UNESCO website entry
Ministère de l’Environnement, de la Protection de la nature, des Bassins de rétention et des Lacs artificiels: Parcs et réserves, 13 October 2005.

National parks of Senegal
Bird sanctuaries
World Heritage Sites in Senegal
Protected areas established in 1971
Ramsar sites in Senegal
World Heritage Sites in Danger